The Catholic Church first prohibited Catholics from membership in Masonic organizations and other secret societies in 1738. Since then, at least eleven popes have made pronouncements about the incompatibility of Catholic doctrines and Freemasonry. From 1738 until 1983, Catholics who publicly associated with, or publicly supported, Masonic organizations were censured with automatic excommunication. Since 1983, the prohibition on membership exists in a different form. Although there was some confusion about membership following the 1962-1965 Second Vatican Council (Vatican II), the Church continues to prohibit membership in Freemasonry because it believes that Masonic principles and rituals are irreconcilable with Catholic doctrines. The current norm, the 1983 Congregation for the Doctrine of the Faith's (CDF) Declaration on Masonic associations, states that "faithful who enroll in Masonic associations are in a state of grave sin and may not receive Holy Communion" and membership in Masonic associations is prohibited. The most recent  document about the "incompatibility of Freemasonry with the Catholic faith" was issued in 1985.

History

In 1736, the Inquisition investigated a Masonic lodge in Florence, Italy, which it condemned in June 1737. The lodge had originally been founded in 1733 by the English Freemason Charles Sackville, 2nd Duke of Dorset, but accepted Italian members, such as the lodge's secretary Tommaso Crudeli. Also in 1736, on 26 December, Andrew Michael Ramsay delivered an oration to a masonic meeting in Paris on the eve of the election of Charles Radclyffe as Grand Master of the French Freemasons. In March 1737 he sent an edited copy to the chief minister, Cardinal André-Hercule de Fleury, seeking his approval for its delivery to an assembly of Freemasons, and his approval of the craft in general. Fleury's response was to brand the Freemasons as traitors, and ban their assemblies. This ban, and the Italian investigation led, in 1738, to Pope Clement XII promulgating In eminenti apostolatus, the first canonical prohibition of Masonic associations.

Clement XII wrote that the reasons for prohibiting masonic associations are that members, "content with  form of natural virtue, are associated with one another" by oaths with "grave penalties" "to conceal in inviolable silence whatever they secretly do together." These associations have aroused suspicions that "to join these associations is precisely synonymous with incurring the taint of evil and infamy, for if they were not involved in evil doing, they would never be so very averse to the light [of publicity]." "The rumor [of these doings] has so grown that" several governments have suppressed them "as being opposed to the welfare of the kingdom." Clement XII wrote, that these kinds of associations are "not consistent with the provisions of either civil or canon law" since they harm both "the peace of the civil state" and "the spiritual salvation of souls."

Pope Leo XII attempted to assess the extent and influence of anti-social organizations.

Reiteration of ban on membership by subsequent popes
 
The ban in In eminenti apostolatus was reiterated and expanded upon by Benedict XIV (1751), Pius VII (1821), Leo XII (1825), Pius VIII (1829), Gregory XVI (1832), Pius IX (1846, 1849, 1864, 1865, 1869, 1873).

"The decisive impetus for the Catholic anti-Masonic movement" was Humanum genus, promulgated by Pope Leo XIII in 1884. Leo XIII wrote that his primary objection to Masonry was naturalism, his accusations were about pantheism, rationalism, and naturalism; but not about Satanism. Leo XIII analysed continental Grand Orient type philosophical "principles and practices." While naturalism was present everywhere in other types of lodges, "the subversive, revolutionary activity characteristic of the Grand Orient lodges of the continent" was not. Leo XIII "emphasises that 'the ultimate and principle aim' of Masonry 'was to destroy to its very foundations any civil or religious order established throughout Christendom, and bring about in its place a new order founded on laws drawn out of the entrails of naturalism'."

Praeclara gratulationis publicae 
In Praeclara gratulationis publicae, Leo XIII namely  stated about Freemasonry: "Although We have spoken on this subject in the strongest terms before, yet We are led by Our Apostolic watchfulness to urge it once more, and We repeat Our warning again and again, that in face of such an eminent peril, no precaution, howsoever great, can be looked upon as sufficient. May God in His Mercy bring to naught their impious designs; nevertheless, let all Christians know and understand that the shameful yoke of Freemasonry must be shaken off once and for all; and let them be the first to shake it off who are most galled by its oppression–the men of Italy and of France. With what weapons and by what method this may best be done We Ourselves have already pointed out: the victory cannot be doubtful to those who trust in that Leader Whose Divine Words still remain in all their force: I have overcome the world."

1917 code of canon law
Under 1917 Code of Canon Law, which was in effect from May 1918 to November 1983, Catholics associated with Masonry were: automatically, i.e. latae sententia, excommunicated (canon 2335), deprived of marriage in the Catholic Church, excluded from Catholic associations, deprived of Catholic funeral rites, invalidated from novitiate, invalidated reception of personal jus patronatus, with additional penalties against clergy, religious, and members of secular institutes.

Under , books which argue that "Masonic sects" and similar groups are "useful and not harmful to the Church and civil society" were prohibited.

Uncertainty following the Second Vatican Council

The Catholic Church began an evaluation of its understanding of Masonry during (but not at) Vatican II. Throughout the jubilee of 1966, Pope Paul VI granted every confessor the faculty to absolve censures and penalties of 1917 Code of Canon Law's canon 2335 incurred by penitents who completely separated themselves from Masonic association and promised to repair and prevent, as far as possible, any scandal and damage they caused.

After a four-year investigation in five Scandinavian Bishops' Conference (CES) countries, the  decided in 1967 to apply the 1966 post-conciliar norms in De Episcoporum Muneribus, "which empowers bishops in special cases to dispense from certain injunctions of Canon Law." The  permitted, within its jurisdiction, converts to Catholicism to retain their Swedish Rite membership, "but only with the specific permission of that person's bishop."

In early 1968, The Tablet reported that Vatican sources had "been quoted as saying that Catholics are now free to join the Masons in the United States, Britain and most other countries of the world. However, the European Grand Orient Lodge of Masons, established primarily in Italy and France, is still considered anti-Catholic or, at least, atheistic," and that "the  'let it be known that Catholics joining the Freemasons are no longer automatically excommunicated. The Church's new attitude has been in effect for more than a year.' The Church's Code of Canon Law drawn up in 1918 and shortly to be reformed, provided for automatic excommunication of Catholics 'who enroll in the Masonic sect or in secret societies conspiring against the Church or the legitimate authorities.' Vatican sources added that this wording would be changed to modify the Church's position when the new Code of Canon Law was completed." These reports apparently caused consternation in the Vatican, and were quickly corrected. The Holy See publicly said that  canon 2335 was not abrogated, and denied it planned to "change profoundly" its historic prohibition against Catholics joining Masonic groups, although confidential sources said "a change in attitude in the future was considered possible."

Informal dialogues between Catholic Church and Masonic representatives took place after Vatican II in Austria, Italy and Germany. In Austria, Freemason Karl Baresch, representative of the Grand Lodge of Austria, informally met Cardinal Franz König, president of the Secretariat for Non-Believers, at Vienna in 1968. It "contained serious faults in philosophical-theological and, above all, historical terms," according to Professor Zbigniew Suchecki, and "was never officially recognized by" the Catholic Church.

In 1971, Bishop Daniel Pezeril, auxiliary bishop of Paris, accepted an invitation from the Grande Loge de France to lecture. This was the first official reception of a Catholic bishop after 1738.

While some speculated about post-conciliar revision of canon law and how norms would be legislated and enforced, the canonical prohibition against Catholics joining Masonic groups remained in force in 1974.

The Catholic Bishops' Conference of England and Wales (CBCEW) stated in 1974 that consultations with the world's bishops failed to produce consensus about the Catholic Church's relationship with Masonry. The  wrote that many bishops had asked it about how to weight and interpret  canon 2335. The divergent replies it gave reflected different situations in various countries. The  reiterated that  canons which establish a penalty are subject to strict interpretation, so canon 2335 applied only to Catholics who were members of Masonic associations that machinate against the Church. The  interpreted  as instructing bishops that  canon 2335 "no longer automatically bars a Catholic from membership of Masonic groups" since it is subject to strict interpretation, and that "a Catholic who joins the Freemasons is excommunicated only if the policy and actions of the Freemasons in his area are known to be hostile to the Church." So, the  defined norms within its jurisdiction, that Catholics, who believed that membership in Masonic associations "does not conflict" with their "deeper loyalty" to their incorporation in the Catholic Church, should "discuss the implications of such membership" with their parish priest. Likewise, Catholics in Masonic associations were "urged to seek reconciliation."

German Bishops' Conference
 
In 1980, after six years of dialogue with representatives of the United Grand Lodges of Germany and investigation of Masonic  rituals, the  produced a report on Freemasonry listing twelve conclusions.

Among the 's conclusions were that Freemasonry denies revelation, and objective truth. They also alleged that religious indifference is fundamental to Freemasonry, and that Freemasonry is Deist, and that it denies the possibility of divine revelation, so threatening the respect due to the Church's teaching office. The sacramental character of Masonic rituals was seen as signifying an individual transformation, offering an alternative path to perfection and having a total claim on the life of a member It concludes by stating that all lodges are forbidden to Catholics, including Catholic-friendly lodges.

Šeper's clarification
The 1981  Declaration concerning status of Catholics becoming Freemasons said that the 1974  reply had "given rise to erroneous and tendentious interpretations." The 1981  declaration also affirmed that the prohibition against Catholics joining Masonic groups had not changed and remained in effect.

1983 code of canon law
The Catholic Church abrogated and replaced 1917 Code of Canon Law, with present 1983 Code of Canon Law which took effect in November 1983.  canon 2335 developed into the 's canon 1374. Unlike the abrogated  canon 2335, however,  canon 1374 does not name any groups it condemns; it states:

This omission led some Catholics and Freemasons, especially in America, to believe that the ban on Catholics becoming Freemasons might have changed, and caused confusion in the church's hierarchy. Many Catholics joined the fraternity, basing their membership on a permissive interpretation of Canon Law and justifying their membership by their belief that Freemasonry does not plot against the Church.

 canon 1374 and  canon 1448 §2 are parallel canons.
 canon 1374 differentiates between being a member of a forbidden association and being an officer or promoter but  canon 1448 §2 does not.

Declaration on Masonic Associations

In 1983, Cardinal Joseph Ratzinger, prefect of the Congregation for the Doctrine of the Faith, with the personal approval of Pope John Paul II, issued a Declaration on Masonic Associations, which reiterated the Church's objections to Freemasonry. The 1983 declaration states that "faithful who enroll in Masonic associations are in a state of grave sin and may not receive Holy Communion. ... the Church's negative judgment in regard to Masonic association(s) remains unchanged since their principles have always been considered irreconcilable with the doctrine of the Church and therefore membership in them remains forbidden.
 "stipulated that neither"  nor  "allowed an individual bishop or bishops' conferences to permit Catholics to belong to masonic lodges."

Continued ban after the declaration
A  committee concluded in its 1985 Letter to U.S. Bishops Concerning Masonry that "the principles and basic rituals of Masonry embody a naturalistic religion active participation in which is incompatible with Christian faith and practice." "Those who knowingly embrace" masonic "principles are committing serious sin" and, according to Law's parenthetical commentary on Whalen, that offense might be punishable under canon 1364. According to that canon, an apostate, heretic, or schismatic incurs a latae sententiae excommunication and clerics can be punished with additional expiatory penalties including dismissal from the clerical state. Caparros et al. elucidates that, in cases where "registration into an association entails apostasy, heresy, or schism" then the offense is punishable under canon 1364. Nevertheless, citing , Caparros et al. states that "those masonic associations that would not be covered by" canon 1374 have "principles  are still seen to be incompatible with the doctrine of the Church." Every delict in canon law is a sin. The "distinction between penal law and morality" is, according to the  committee, that not all sins are violations in canon law – so in a case where a sin is not also a violation or delict in canon law, it is a fallacy to conclude that "it is permissible to commit it."

In 1996, Bishop Fabian Bruskewitz, of the Roman Catholic Diocese of Lincoln, legislated that Catholic members of masonic associations in the diocese, incur a latae sententiae censure of a one-month interdict during which they are forbidden to receive holy communion; those who continue membership incur a latae sententiae censure of excommunication. Those excommunications which were challenged through a process of canonical recourse were affirmed by a judgment of the Holy See in 2006.

In 2000, David Patterson, executive secretary of the Masonic Service Bureau of Los Angeles, asked Cardinal Roger Mahony "whether a practicing Catholic may join a Masonic Lodge." Father Thomas Anslow, Judicial Vicar of the Roman Catholic Archdiocese of Los Angeles, replied to Patterson that "the matter is too complex for a straightforward 'yes' or 'no' answer. But at least for Catholics in the United States, I believe the answer is probably yes." Because he was "unaware of any ideology or practice by the local lodges that challenges or subverts the doctrine and interests of the Catholic Church," Anslow wrote that his "qualified response" is "probably yes."  Anslow publicly retracted his 2000 letter in 2002, with the explanation that his analysis was faulty. He wrote that, according to the  reflection about the  declaration, "the system of symbols" used in Masonry can "foster a 'supraconfessional humanitarian conception of "the divine that neutralizes or replaces the faith dimension of our relationship with God."

In 2002, the Catholic Bishops' Conference of the Philippines decreed that:
a Catholic who is a "publicly known" Freemason – who "actively participates" or "promotes its views" or "holds any office" – and refuses to renounce his membership after being warned in accord with  canon 1347, "is to be punished with an interdict," in accord with  canon 1374, including: exclusion from receiving the sacraments; prohibition against acting as a sponsor in Baptism and Confirmation; prohibition against being a member of any parish or diocesan structure; and denial of Catholic funeral rites, unless some signs of repentance before death were shown, regardless, to avoid public scandal in a case where a bishop allows funeral rites, Masonic services are prohibited in the church and prohibited immediately before or after the Catholic funeral rites at the cemetery.
a Catholic who is a Freemason, "notoriously adhering to the Masonic vision," is automatically excommunicated under canon 1364 and is automatically censured in accord with  canon 1331
a Freemason is prohibited from acting a witness to marriage in the Catholic Church, and prohibited from being a member of any associations of the faithful

The Masonic Information Center pointed out in 2006 that , which prohibits membership in Masonic associations, "remains in effect."

Bishop Gianfranco Girotti, regent of the Apostolic Penitentiary, told the 2007 Freemasonry and the Catholic Church conference, at the Pontifical Theological Faculty of St. Bonaventure in Rome, that doctrine has not changed. Girotti, quoting the  declaration, reiterated that masonic philosophy is incompatible with Catholic faith. Likewise, reacting to the news of an 85-year-old Catholic priest, Rosario Francesco Esposito, becoming a member in a Masonic lodge, Girotti told Vatican Radio in May 2007 that the  declaration "." Girotti called on priests who had declared themselves to be Freemasons to be disciplined by their direct superiors.

In 2013, a Catholic priest at Megève, France, was "stripped of his functions at the request of the"  for being an active member of the Grand Orient de France.

Current position of the Church on Catholics joining the Fraternity 
The Catholic Church's current norm on Masonic associations is the 1983  Declaration on Masonic associations. The 1983  declaration states that Catholics "who enroll in Masonic associations are in a state of grave sin and may not receive Holy Communion."

The 1983  declaration clarified the omission of association names in 1983 Code of Canon Law (1983 CIC) by stating that the "editorial criterion which was followed" did not mention association names since "they are contained in wider categories."  canon 1374 states that a Catholic "who joins an association which plots against the Church is to be punished with a just penalty; one who promotes or takes office in such an association is to be punished with an interdict." This contrasted with the 1917 Code of Canon Law (1917 CIC), which explicitly declared that joining Freemasonry entailed automatic excommunication. The omission of association names, like Masonic associations, from the  prompted Catholics and Masons to question whether the ban on Catholics becoming Freemasons was still active, especially after the perceived liberalization of the Church after Vatican II.

A number of Catholics became Freemasons assuming that the Church had softened its stance. The 1983  declaration addressed this misinterpretation of the Code of Canon Law, clarifying that:

The "irreconcilable principles" that the Church believes Freemasonry possesses include a "deistic God", naturalism, and religious indifferentism.

Near the time that the 1983  declaration was released, bishops' conferences in Germany and America also released independent reports on the question of Freemasonry. The conclusions of the German Bishops' Conference (DBK) in its 1980 report on Masonry and cited by the U.S. Conference of Catholic Bishops (USCCB) in its 1985 letter included that "research on the ritual and on the Masonic mentality makes it clear that it is impossible to belong to the Catholic Church and to Freemasonry at the same time."

Some of the doctrines are incorporated into Catholic social teaching which are, in the Compendium of the Social Doctrine of the Church, to appreciate democratic political systems which are accountable to the governed and to "reject all secret organizations that seek to influence or subvert the functioning of legitimate institutions."

According to Cardinal Gianfranco Ravasi, president of the Pontifical Council for Culture,  and  "are significant texts as they address the theoretical and practical reasons for the irreconcilability of masonry and Catholicism as concepts of truth, religion, God, man and the world, spirituality, ethics, rituality and tolerance."

Freemasonry's position on Catholics joining the Fraternity 
Masonic bodies do not ban Catholics from joining if they wish to do so. There has never been a Masonic prohibition against Catholics joining the fraternity, and some Freemasons are Catholics, despite the Catholic Church's prohibition of joining the freemasons.

Catholic fraternal societies 
Freemasonry was an important catalyst in the founding of the Knights of Columbus and the Knights of Peter Claver in the United States and the Knights of the Southern Cross in Australia, because one of the attractions of Freemasonry was that it provided a number of social services unavailable to non-members (e.g., devout Catholics).

Michael McGivney, a Catholic priest in New Haven, Connecticut, wished to provide Catholic men with a Catholic fraternal organization, an alternative to Freemasonry with the attractiveness of selected membership and secret initiation, but neither oath-bound nor secret. Thus he founded the Knights of Columbus, believing that Catholicism and fraternalism were not incompatible and wished to found a society that would encourage men to be proud of their American Catholic heritage. McGivney was beatified by Pope Francis in 2020.

The KoC, though accepting African-American members early on in its history, soon came to identify in many of its councils with segregationist and anti-Black viewpoints, leading to the denial of membership to many prospective black candidates. As a result, the Josephites founded the Knights of Peter Claver in 1909, which as of 2021 is the largest and oldest Black Catholic organization in America.

See also

 Anticlericalism and Freemasonry
 Anti-Masonry
 Nicodemites
 Christianity and Freemasonry
 Papal documents relating to Freemasonry
 Religious Issue (Brazil)

Notes

References

 

 

 

 Translated in

Further reading

 
 

Anti-Masonry